The 2008 Army Black Knights football team represented the United States Military Academy (USMA or "West Point") as an independent during the 2008 NCAA Division I FBS football season. The team was led by second-year head coach Stan Brock, who, amidst pressure from critics, had changed from a pro-style offense to a triple option-like offensive scheme after the previous season. Some pundits dubbed it the "Brock Bone" or "quadruple" option, due to an added passing element. The team finished the season with a disappointing 3–9 record, which culminated in a 34–0 rout by archrival Navy. Brock was subsequently fired and replaced by former Cal Poly head coach, Rich Ellerson. The 2008 Army–Navy Game was the first shut-out of Army by Navy since 1978. One consolation was that in the game's final play, Army fullback Collin Mooney, in the last play of his college football career, broke the school record for single-season rushing by a single yard.

Schedule

Roster
 LB Josh McNary, So.
 Alejandro Villanueva
 Patrick Mealy
 Andre Shinda
 LB Stephen Anderson #50
Chip Bowden
Carson Williams	
Wesley McMahand
Justin Turner	
Collin Mooney	
Bryson Carl	
Tony Dace	
Ian Smith	
Patrick Mealy	
Carlo Sandiego	
George Fletcher	
Geoffrey Hewitt	
Robert McClary	
Kingsley Ehie	
Mike Wright	
Jameson Carter	
Damion Hunter	
Jamison Maehler	
Joe Leforte	
Mike Evans
Brandon Cox		
Jason Johnson
Mike Lemming			
Trey Mirrane	
Derek Eling	
Jeremy Jonas		
Tyson Quink			
Matthew Campbell		
Adam Demarco		
Fritz Bentler		
Ted Bentler	
Victor Ugenyi	
Nicholas Emmons		
Michael Gann					
Marcus Hilton	
Joe Paolini		
John Plumstead
Frank Scappaticci
Peter Anderson
Matt Eason	
Steve Erzinger
Josh Jones		
Bradley Marren	
Rod Murray	
Lowell Garthwaite
Mario Hill
Donovan Travis
Jordan Trimble
Antuan Aaron	
David Black	
Lawrence Brown		
Donnie Dixon	
Eric Jones	
Richard King	
Desmond Lamb		
Markenson Pierre	
Joseph Puttmann		
T.J. Walker		
Andrew Rinehart

References

Army
Army Black Knights football seasons
Army Black Knights football